Louis Pijourlet  (born ) is a French male track cyclist, representing France at international competitions. He participated at the 2014 UEC European Track Championships in the men's team pursuit. He won the bronze medal at the 2016-17 UCI Track Cycling World Cup, Round 2 in Apeldoorn in the team pursuit.

References

1995 births
Living people
French male cyclists
French track cyclists
Place of birth missing (living people)